Ein Mädchen von 16½ is an East German film. It was released in 1958.

External links
 

1958 films
East German films
1950s German-language films
Films directed by Carl Balhaus
1950s German films